Ihre may refer to:

People
 Albrecht Elof Ihre (1797–1877), Swedish diplomat and politician
 Johan Ihre (1707–1780), Swedish philologist and historical linguist
  (1659–1720), Swedish theologist

Other
 a German possessive pronoun.